Shine Your Eyes is a 2020 drama film directed by Matias Mariani written by Chika Anadu, Francine Barbosa, Maíra Bühler, Matias Mariani, Júlia Murat, Chioma Thompson and Roberto Winter and starring O.C. Ukeje, Paolo André and Barry Igujie.

The film premiered in the Panorama portion of the 70th Berlin International Film Festival. , all ten reviews compiled by Rotten Tomatoes are positive, with an average rating of 7.19/10. The film was made available worldwide through the Netflix streaming services.

Cast 
 OC Ukeje as Amadi
 Paolo André
 Barry Igujie
 Chukwudi Iwuji as Ikenna
 Indira Nascimento
 Yasmin Thin Qi

Release 
Shine Your Eyes was released on July 29, 2020 on Netflix.

Reception
On review aggregator Rotten Tomatoes, the film has an approval rating of 100% based on 10 reviews, with an average rating of 7.2/10.

References

External links
 
 

2020 films
2020 drama films
Brazilian drama films
2020s English-language films
2020s Portuguese-language films
Portuguese-language Netflix original films
Films shot in São Paulo
Brazilian multilingual films
2020 multilingual films